Daniel W. Long  (August 27, 1867 – April 30, 1929) was an American baseball player. He was an outfielder in Major League Baseball and played for the Baltimore Orioles of the American Association in 21 games in 1890. He was born in Boston, Massachusetts.

External links
 Baseball Reference

19th-century baseball players
Baltimore Orioles (AA) players
Major League Baseball outfielders
Baseball players from Boston
1867 births
1929 deaths
Minor league baseball managers
Oakland Greenhood & Morans players
San Francisco Pioneers players
San Francisco Seals (baseball) managers
Oakland Colonels players
Baltimore Orioles (Atlantic Association) players